Ljuba Danielovna Kristol (born May 26, 1944, in Leningrad) is a Russian-born Israeli chess player who holds the ICCF title of Lady Grandmaster (LGM) and the FIDE title of Woman International Master (WIM).

She is best known for winning the ICCF Women's World Championship in correspondence chess on two occasions:  between 1978 and 1984, and between 1993 and 1998.

She grew up in Leningrad (now St. Petersburg), and since 1976 has lived in Israel.
Kristol is the four-time OTB women's chess champion of Israel.

She took part in four Chess Olympiads as a member of the Israeli team. In the Olympiad in 1976 (which took place in Haifa), Kristol won the gold medal with the Israeli team.

In 1989 Kristol participated in a zonal tournament in Haifa, and shared 1st–2nd place.

Tournaments 
Major tournaments that Kristol participated in

References

External links 
 
 
 
 

1944 births
Living people
Russian female chess players
Israeli female chess players
Soviet female chess players
Chess Woman International Masters
World Correspondence Chess Champions
Sportspeople from Saint Petersburg
Soviet emigrants to Israel
Jewish chess players
Russian Jews
Israeli Jews